William Albert Lindsey was an American Negro league shortstop in the 1920s.

Lindsey played for the Dayton Marcos in 1926. In 17 recorded games, he posted nine hits in 48 plate appearances.

References

External links
 and Baseball-Reference Black Baseball Stats and Seamheads

Year of birth missing
Year of death missing
Place of birth missing
Place of death missing
Dayton Marcos players
Baseball shortstops